Tywyn railway station serves the town of Tywyn in Gwynedd, Wales. The station is on the Cambrian Coast Line, with passenger services to Barmouth, Harlech, Porthmadog, Pwllheli, Aberdovey, Machynlleth and Shrewsbury.

History
The line was built by the Aberystwith and Welsh Coast Railway in 1863 and became incorporated in the Cambrian Railways in 1867. Upon the line opening a temporary station was located adjacent to Neptune Road bridge until the present permanent station was completed a few years later. The Welsh romantic poet John Ceiriog Hughes was stationmaster at Tywyn for a brief period in 1870.

In 1922 Cambrian Railways became part of the Great Western Railway and in 1948 following nationalisation operation of the station passed to British Railways Western Region. Until the 1960s there was a summer service between London Paddington and Pwllheli, via Birmingham Snow Hill, Shrewsbury and Machynlleth.

Unlike most stations on the Cambrian Line, Tywyn has retained two platforms and a passing loop. The station however is unstaffed, and the original station buildings remained derelict from the 1980s until the mid-2000s when they were refurbished as offices. In 2013 the building on the up side was in use as a Spiritualist Church.

Facilities

There are no staff at Tywyn, but there are Help Points, announcements and departure boards. There is also a small car park with 20 spaces and a bike rack with six spaces. There are no ticketing facilities either.

Services

As the area was a test bed for the new ERTMS signalling system, services are exclusively operated by Class 158 DMUs; these are the only units operated by Transport for Wales currently equipped for ERTMS operation.

References

External links

Railway stations in Gwynedd
DfT Category F1 stations
Former Cambrian Railway stations
Railway stations in Great Britain opened in 1863
Railway stations served by Transport for Wales Rail
Tywyn